Aksakovo may refer to:

Places in Bulgaria
Aksakovo, Bulgaria, a town in Bulgaria
Aksakovo Municipality

Villages in Russia
Aksakovo, Vladimir Oblast
Aksakovo, Belebeyevsky District, Republic of Bashkortostan
Aksakovo, Yermekeyevsky District, Republic of Bashkortostan
Aksakovo, Karmaskalinsky District, Republic of Bashkortostan
Bolshoye Aksakovo, in Sterlitamaksky District, Bashkortostan

See also
Aksakov